Matthew John Bostock (born 16 July 1997) is a Manx road and track cyclist, who currently rides for UCI ProTeam . He won a bronze medal riding for Great Britain, at the 2016 UEC European Track Championships, in the team pursuit.

At the 2022 Commonwealth Games in Birmingham, Bostock was one of several riders involved in a serious crash during the heats of the Men's Scratch Race. Bostock was one of two riders taken to hospital.

Major results

Road

2015
 3rd Overall Driedaagse van Axel
2017
 4th Beaumont Trophy
2019
 National Circuit Series
1st Otley
1st Abergavenny
1st Newcastle
1st Colne
1st Barnsley
 1st Birkenhead, Tour Series
 2nd Road race, National Under-23 Road Championships
 3rd National Circuit Race Championships
 6th Youngster Coast Challenge
2020
 3rd Dorpenomloop Rucphen
2021
 6th Heistse Pijl
 7th Cholet-Pays de la Loire
 10th Circuit de Wallonie
2022
 National Road Championships
1st  Circuit race
5th Road race
 Tour Series
1st Clacton-on-Sea
1st Manchester
 2nd Overall Tour de la Mirabelle
1st  Points classification
1st Stage 4
 8th Elfstedenronde

Track

2016
 1st Team pursuit, UCI World Cup, Glasgow
 2nd Madison (with Matt Walls), National Championships
 3rd  Team pursuit, UEC European Championships
 3rd  Team pursuit, UEC European Under-23 Championships
2017
 1st  Team pursuit, UEC European Under-23 Championships
 2nd Team pursuit, National Championships
2018
 1st  Team pursuit, UEC European Under-23 Championships

References

External links

1997 births
Living people
British male cyclists
Manx male cyclists
British track cyclists
People from Douglas, Isle of Man